The Texas A&M Aggie ring (also simply Aggie Ring)  is one of the various well-known symbols of Texas A&M University and a visible way to distinguish Aggies all over the world. The Texas A&M ring was formally adopted in 1889, and its design has remained relatively unchanged since then. The only major change that has been done on the original design was a result of the renaming of the university from “Agricultural and Mechanical College of Texas” to “Texas A&M University” in 1963. The current Aggie Ring was designed by E. C. Jonas in 1894. The Aggie ring has distinct physical features, is surrounded by various unique traditions, and has very specific requirements for eligibility.

Appearance  
The top of the ring depicts an eagle and a shield with five stars and thirteen stripes. The eagle denotes agility, power, and ability to reach great heights. The shield symbolizes the duty to protect the reputation of the alma mater; the five stars within the shield refer to the facets of student development: mind, body, spiritual attainment, emotional poise, and integrity of character while the thirteen stripes represent the thirteen original colonies and symbolize patriotism. On one side of the ring, there is a five-point star borrowed from the seal of the state of Texas while the surrounding oak leaves symbolize strength. On the other side of the ring are a cannon, a saber, and a rifle, which symbolize Aggies' preparedness and valor in defending their land. The crossed flags of the United States and Texas symbolize allegiance to both nation and state.

Traditions 
There are several traditions centered around the Aggie ring. One main tradition refers to the way students wear their rings at different points in their lives. Current students who have not yet graduated wear their Aggie ring with the class year facing them to signify that their time at Texas A&M University has not yet concluded. Then, at the annual Ring Dance or at the graduation ceremony, students turn their rings around in such a way that the class year faces away symbolizing readiness to “face the world”. Another unofficial tradition, though unsanctioned and discouraged by the university, is referred to as the Aggie ring dunk. It consists of students dropping their newly acquired Aggie rings in a pitcher of beer followed by drinking the beer to its entirety as fast as possible in a single action and catching the Aggie ring between their teeth. It is commonly done as a race or game among friends and peers who receive their Aggie rings around the same time.  Students receive their rings on what is known as Aggie Ring Day, a special time for Aggies, their families, and their friends to celebrate being a part of the Aggie Network. This celebration is held at the Clayton W. Williams, Jr. Alumni Center three times a year.

Requirements and Eligibility 
For students to receive their Aggie rings during their time at Texas A&M University, students are required to meet specific qualifications. Current undergraduate students must be in good academic standing with a minimum 2.0 GPA on a 4.0 scale; students must also complete 90 credit hours of course work with a minimum of 45 credit hours earned at Texas A&M University. Graduate students are eligible to receive their Aggie rings once 75% of their graduate course work is completed. If a student’s graduate degree requires a thesis, his or her Aggie ring will be delivered once the thesis has been defended by the specified university deadline. If the thesis has not been defended by this deadline, the student’s Aggie ring will be held until this qualification is met. Post-doctorate students are eligible to receive their Aggie rings once all formal course work has been completed with a minimum 3.0 GPA; students must also complete their residency requirement, pass their preliminary exam, and have an approved research proposal on file. Finally, if students are unable to meet these requirements throughout their time at Texas A&M University, an Aggie ring can be purchased upon graduation.

References 

Texas A&M University
Rings (jewellery)